During the 1993–94 English football season, Blackburn Rovers F.C. competed in the FA Premier League.

Season summary
It was another strong season for a resurgent Blackburn, who were in the higher reaches of the Premier League all season long and, at one stage in early April, were level on points with leaders Manchester United, who had led the league almost from start to finish and entered 1994 with a 16-point lead. The return of Alan Shearer from a long-term injury saw him make a swift return to his superb form of old, with the 23-year-old hitman scoring 31 goals in the league, including both of Blackburn's goals in an early April win over Manchester United at Ewood Park. Before the start of the season, Blackburn had been pipped by Manchester United to the signature of Nottingham Forest midfielder Roy Keane for a national record fee of £3.75million.

In the end, though, it wasn't quite enough to snatch the title crown off Manchester United, who had returned to their winning ways before the end of April, after Blackburn took their turn to drop points, and Kenny Dalglish's men had to settle for runners-up spot and a UEFA Cup place. This meant that Blackburn would be competing in Europe for the very first time in their history, although in the UEFA Cup rather than the European Cup as would have happened if they had won the league. Blackburn's fourth-place finish a year earlier had not been enough for a UEFA Cup place due to English clubs still not having all their UEFA Cup places back despite their ban from European competitions arising from the Heysel disaster having been lifted for the 1990-91 season.

Blackburn fans were thrilled after the end of the season when 21-year-old Norwich City striker Chris Sutton joined the club for an English record fee of £5 million, following competition from the likes of Arsenal and Manchester United for his signature. With the most expensive striker-partnership in the country, the club's fans were given all the more reason to expect their team to succeed in at least one of the four major competitions that they would be contesting next season.

Kit
Japanese company Asics manufactured Blackburn's kit this season. British brewery McEwan's Lager were the kit sponsors.

Final league table

Results
Blackburn Rovers' score comes first

Legend

FA Premier League

FA Cup

League Cup

Squad

Left the club during season

References

Blackburn Rovers F.C. seasons
Blackburn Rovers